In the second part of the 19th century, Celso Golmayo Zúpide had been generally accepted as Cuban champion since his 1862 match defeat of Félix Sicre. In 1912–1937 Cuban Championship as Copa Dewar occurred. Maria Teresa Mora was the first woman who won Copa Dewar in 1922.

{| class="sortable wikitable"
! Year !! City !! Winner
|-
| 1860 || Havana || Félix Sicre
|-
| 1862 ||Havana||Celso Golmayo Zúpide
|-
| 1897 ||Havana||Celso Golmayo Torriente
|-
| 1898 ||Havana||Juan Corzo
|-
| 1902 ||Havana||Juan Corzo
|-
| 1907 ||Havana||Juan Corzo
|-
| 1912 ||Havana||Juan Corzo
|-
| 1914 || || Rafael Blanco
|-
| 1918 || ||Juan Corzo
|-
| 1920 || ||Rafael Blanco
|-
| 1921 || || Baire Benítez
|-
| 1922 ||Havana||María Teresa Mora
|-
| 1923 ||Havana||José Fernández Migoya
|-
| 1927 || || Francisco Planas
|-
| 1929 || ||Francisco Planas
|-
| 1937 || ||Rafael Blanco
|-
| 1939 || || Miguel Alemán
|-
| 1942 || || Juan González de Vega
|-
| 1943 || ||Juan González de Vega
|-
| 1944 || || Angel Fernández Fernández
|-
| 1950 || || Rosendo Romero  Eldis Cobo Arteaga
|-
| 1951 || ||Juan González de Vega
|-
| 1952 ||Havana||Juan González de Vega
|-
| 1955 ||Havana|| Carlos Calero
|-
| 1956 || || Armando Cabrera
|-
| 1957 || || Eleazar Jiménez
|-
| 1958 || || Rogelio Ortega
|-
| 1960 ||Havana||Eleazar Jiménez
|-
| 1963 ||Havana||Eleazar Jiménez
|-
| 1965 ||Havana||Eleazar Jiménez
|-
| 1966 ||Havana||Rogelio Ortega
|-
| 1967 ||Havana||Eleazar Jiménez
|-
| 1968 || Santiago de Cuba || Silvino García Martínez
|-
| 1969 || Matanzas || Jesús Rodríguez Gonzáles
|-
| 1970 ||Havana||Silvino García Martínez
|-
| 1971 ||Havana||Jesús Rodríguez Gonzáles
|-
| 1972 || Playa Larga, Matanzas||Jesús Rodríguez Gonzáles
|-
| 1973 || Cienfuegos ||Silvino García Martínez
|-
| 1974 || Varadero, Matanzas || Guillermo Garcia González
|-
| 1975 || Santa Clara || Guillermo Estévez Morales
|-
| 1976 || Holguín || José Fernandez Leon
|-
| 1977 || Sancti Spiritus || Gerardo Lebredo Zarragoitia  José Luis Vilela de Acuña  Jesús Nogueiras
|-
| 1978 || Camagüey ||Jesús Nogueiras
|-
| 1979 ||Santiago de Cuba||Silvino García Martínez
|-
| 1980 ||Holguín||Néstor Vélez
|-
| 1981–2 || Sagua la Grande || Román Hernández Onna
|-
| 1983 || Sagua de Tánamo ||Guillermo Garcia González
|-
| 1984 ||Holguín||Jesús Nogueiras  Amador Rodríguez Céspedes
|-
| 1985 ||Camagüey||Jorge Armas
|-
| 1986 ||Santiago de Cuba||Walter Arencibia
|-
| 1987 || Las Tunas || Juan Borges
|-
| 1988 ||Camagüey||Amador Rodríguez Céspedes
|-
| 1989 || Sancti Spiritus || Pedro Paneque
|-
| 1990 ||Santiago de Cuba||Walter Arencibia
|-
| 1991 ||Holguín||Jesús Nogueiras
|-
| 1993 || Matanzas ||Juan Borges
|-
| 1995 ||Matanzas||Julio Becerra  Juan Borges
|-
| 1996 || Las Tunas || Irisberto Herrera  Julio Becerra
|-
| 1997 ||Matanzas||Reinaldo Vera  Amador Rodríguez Céspedes
|-
| 1998 ||Matanzas||Julio Becerra
|-
| 1999 ||Santa Clara||Rodne Pérez
|-
| 2000 ||Santa Clara||Jesús Nogueiras
|-
| 2001 ||Las Tunas||Reinaldo Vera
|-
| 2002 ||Holguín||Leinier Domínguez
|-
| 2003 || Varadero, Matanzas ||Leinier Domínguez
|-
| 2004 ||Santa Clara||Lázaro Bruzón
|-
| 2005 ||Santa Clara||Lázaro Bruzón
|-
| 2006 ||Santa Clara||Leinier Domínguez
|-
| 2007 ||Santa Clara||Lázaro Bruzón
|-
| 2008 ||Santa Clara||Yuniesky Quesada
|-
| 2009 ||Las Tunas||Lázaro Bruzón
|-
| 2010 || Ciego de Ávila ||Lázaro Bruzón
|-
| 2011 ||Ciego de Ávila||Yuniesky Quezada
|-
| 2012 ||Ciego de Ávila||Leinier Domínguez
|-
| 2013 ||Santa Clara||Isan Reynaldo Ortiz Suárez
|-
| 2014 ||Santa Clara||Isan Reynaldo Ortiz Suárez
|- 
| 2015 ||Santa Clara||Isan Reynaldo Ortiz Suárez
|-
| 2016 ||Matanzas||Leinier Domínguez
|-
| 2017 ||Villa Clara||Lázaro Bruzón
|-
| 2018 ||Havana||Yuri Gonzalez Vidal
|-
| 2019 ||Villa Clara||Carlos Daniel Albornoz Cabrera
|-
| 2020 ||Villa Clara||Carlos Daniel Albornoz Cabrera
|-
|2021
|
|
|-
|2022
|Santa Clara
|Yasser Quesada Pérez
|}

Women
{| class="sortable wikitable"
! Year !! City !! Winner
|-
| 1965 ||Havana||Syla Martínez
|-
| 1966 || || Nora Laya
|-
| 1967 || ||Nora Laya
|-
| 1968 || ||Nora Laya
|-
| 1969 || || Elisa Yarruch
|-
| 1970 || || Ada María Salgado
|-
| 1971 || || Asela de Armas Pérez
|-
| 1972 || ||Nora Laya
|-
| 1973 || ||Asela de Armas Pérez
|-
| 1974 || ||Asela de Armas Pérez
|-
| 1975 || ||Asela de Armas Pérez
|-
| 1976 || ||Asela de Armas Pérez
|-
| 1977 || ||Asela de Armas Pérez
|-
| 1978 || ||Asela de Armas Pérez
|-
| 1979 || ||Asela de Armas Pérez
|-
| 1980 || || Vivian Ramón Pita
|-
| 1981 || || Zirka Frómeta Castillo
|-
| 1982 || ||Vivian Ramón Pita
|-
| 1983 || ||Zirka Frómeta Castillo
|-
| 1984 || ||Vivian Ramón Pita
|-
| 1985 || || Tania Hernández
|-
| 1986 || ||Asela de Armas Pérez
|-
| 1987 || ||Zirka Frómeta Castillo
|-
| 1988 || ||Asela de Armas Pérez
|-
| 1989 || ||Vivian Ramón Pita
|-
| 1990 || ||Vivian Ramón Pita
|-
| 1991 || ||Vivian Ramón Pita
|-
| 1992 || || Maritza Arribas Robaina
|-
| 1993 || || Roquelina Fandiño Reyes
|-
| 1994 || || Yudania Hernández Estévez
|-
| 1995 || || Mairelys Delgado Crespo
|-
| 1997 ||Havana||Maritza Arribas Robaina
|-
| 1998 || ||Vivian Ramón Pita
|-
| 1999 || ||Mairelys Delgado Crespo
|-
| 2000 || ||Vivian Ramón Pita
|-
| 2001 || ||Maritza Arribas Robaina
|-
| 2002 || ||Maritza Arribas Robaina
|-
| 2003 || ||Maritza Arribas Robaina
|-
| 2004 || ||Maritza Arribas Robaina
|-
| 2005 || || Sulennis Piña Vega
|-
| 2006 || Caibarien || Milena Campos Vila
|-
| 2007 || ||Maritza Arribas Robaina
|-
| 2008 || Holguín ||Maritza Arribas Robaina
|-
| 2009 || ||Maritza Arribas Robaina
|-
| 2010 ||Holguín||Oleiny Linares Nápoles
|-
| 2011 || Santiago de Cuba || Yaniet Marrero Lopez
|-
| 2012 ||Holguín||Lisandra Llaudy Pupo
|-
| 2013 ||Holguín||Maritza Arribas Robaina
|-
| 2014 || Pinar del Río ||Sulennis Piña Vega
|-
| 2015 ||Santiago de Cuba||Maritza Arribas Robaina
|-
| 2016 || Cienfuegos ||Oleyni Linares Nápoles
|-
| 2017 || Pinar del Río || Yerisbel Miranda Llanes
|-
| 2018 ||Holguín||Lisandra Llaudy Pupo
|}

References 

 (results from 1902 through 1984)
Details on the 2000 edition

Details on the 2008 edition

External links
Chess Tournament Begun by Che - Revived in Havana Radio Nuevitas, October 10, 2008

Chess national championships
Women's chess national championships
Chess in Cuba
Sport in Havana
Chess